Rafael Lima may refer to:

 Rafael Lima (boxer) (born 1983), Brazilian boxer
 Rafael Lima (footballer) (born 1986), Brazilian footballer